Wavertree may refer to:  

Wavertree, an area of Liverpool, in Merseyside, England
Liverpool Wavertree (UK Parliament constituency)
Wavertree (ward), a Liverpool City Council Ward within the Liverpool Wavertree Parliamentary constituency
Wavertree railway station (disused)
Wavertree (ship), a historic sailing ship at the South Street Seaport in New York City